Port Alberni Water Aerodrome  is located in Alberni Inlet, adjacent to Port Alberni, British Columbia, Canada.

Airlines and destinations

See also
 List of airports on Vancouver Island

References

Seaplane bases in British Columbia
Port Alberni
Registered aerodromes in British Columbia